The Tash-Tau mine is a large copper mine located in the south-west of Russia in Bashkortostan. Tash-Tau represents one of the largest copper reserve in Russia and in the world having estimated reserves of 111.7 million tonnes of ore grading 8.63% copper.

See also 
 List of mines in Russia

References 

Copper mines in Russia